"Gravity" is an alternative rock song written by Tim Henwood and performed by Australian band The Superjesus. The song was released in September 2000 as the lead single from the band's second studio album, Jet Age (2000). Although originally disliked by other band members, this song peaked at number 35 on the Australian ARIA Singles Chart.  

In January 2001, the song was ranked as number 17 in the Triple J Hottest 100, 2000.

Track listing
CD Single (8573848762)
 "Gravity" - 4:01
 "Everybody Calls Me Lonely" - 3:32
 "Miss This" - 3:19

Charts

References

2000 singles
2000 songs
Songs written by Sarah McLeod (musician)
Song recordings produced by Ed Buller
Warner Records singles
The Superjesus songs